Plumville is a ghost town in Yazoo County, Mississippi, United States.

References

Former populated places in Yazoo County, Mississippi
Ghost towns in Mississippi